Stericta subviridalis is a species of moth of the family Pyralidae. It is found in Papua New Guinea.

It has a wingspan of 28 mm.

References

Epipaschiinae
Moths described in 1912